In mathematics — specifically, in Riemannian geometry — geodesic convexity is a natural generalization of convexity for sets and functions to Riemannian manifolds. It is common to drop the prefix "geodesic" and refer simply to "convexity" of a set or function.

Definitions

Let (M, g) be a Riemannian manifold.

 A subset C of M is said to be a geodesically convex set if, given any two points in C, there is a unique minimizing geodesic  contained within C that joins those two points.
 Let C be a geodesically convex subset of M. A function  is said to be a (strictly) geodesically convex function if the composition

 is a (strictly) convex function in the usual sense for every unit speed geodesic arc γ : [0, T] → M contained within C.

Properties

 A geodesically convex (subset of a) Riemannian manifold is also a convex metric space with respect to the geodesic distance.

Examples

 A subset of n-dimensional Euclidean space En with its usual flat metric is geodesically convex if and only if it is convex in the usual sense, and similarly for functions.
 The "northern hemisphere" of the 2-dimensional sphere S2 with its usual metric is geodesically convex. However, the subset A of S2 consisting of those points with latitude further north than 45° south is not geodesically convex, since the minimizing geodesic (great circle) arc joining two distinct points on the southern boundary of A leaves A (e.g. in the case of two points 180° apart in longitude, the geodesic arc passes over the south pole).

References

 

 

Convex optimization
Riemannian manifolds
Geodesic (mathematics)